Daniel Dennett's multiple drafts model of consciousness is a physicalist theory of consciousness based upon cognitivism, which views the mind in terms of information processing. The theory is described in depth in his book, Consciousness Explained, published in 1991. As the title states, the book proposes a high-level explanation of consciousness which is consistent with support for the possibility of strong AI.

Dennett describes the theory as first-person operationalism. As he states it:

The thesis of multiple drafts
Dennett's thesis is that our modern understanding of consciousness is unduly influenced by the ideas of René Descartes. To show why, he starts with a description of the phi illusion. In this experiment, two different coloured lights, with an angular separation of a few degrees at the eye, are flashed in succession. If the interval between the flashes is less than a second or so, the first light that is flashed appears to move across to the position of the second light. Furthermore, the light seems to change colour as it moves across the visual field. A green light will appear to turn red as it seems to move across to the position of a red light. Dennett asks how we could see the light change colour before the second light is observed.

Dennett claims that conventional explanations of the colour change boil down to either Orwellian or Stalinesque hypotheses, which he says are the result of Descartes' continued influence on our vision of the mind. In an Orwellian hypothesis, the subject comes to one conclusion, then goes back and changes that memory in light of subsequent events. This is akin to George Orwell's Nineteen Eighty-Four, where records of the past are routinely altered. In a Stalinesque hypothesis, the two events would be reconciled prior to entering the subject's consciousness, with the final result presented as fully resolved. This is akin to Joseph Stalin's show trials, where the verdict has been decided in advance and the trial is just a rote presentation.

Dennett argues that there is no principled basis for picking one of these theories over the other, because they share a common error in supposing that there is a special time and place where unconscious processing becomes consciously experienced, entering into what Dennett calls the "Cartesian theatre". Both theories require us to cleanly divide a sequence of perceptions and reactions into before and after the instant that they reach the seat of consciousness, but he denies that there is any such moment, as it would lead to infinite regress. Instead, he asserts that there is no privileged place in the brain where consciousness happens. Dennett states that, "[t]here does not exist ... a process such as 'recruitment of consciousness' (into what?), nor any place where the 'vehicle's arrival' is recognized (by whom?)"

With no theatre, there is no screen, hence no reason to re-present data after it has already been analysed. Dennett says that, "the Multiple Drafts model goes on to claim that the brain does not bother 'constructing' any representations that go to the trouble of 'filling in' the blanks. That would be a waste of time and (shall we say?) paint. The judgement is already in so we can get on with other tasks!"

According to the model, there are a variety of sensory inputs from a given event and also a variety of interpretations of these inputs. The sensory inputs arrive in the brain and are interpreted at different times, so a given event can give rise to a succession of discriminations, constituting the equivalent of multiple drafts of a story. As soon as each discrimination is accomplished, it becomes available for eliciting a behaviour; it does not have to wait to be presented at the theatre.

Like a number of other theories, the Multiple Drafts model understands conscious experience as taking time to occur, such that percepts do not instantaneously arise in the mind in their full richness. The distinction is that Dennett's theory denies any clear and unambiguous boundary separating conscious experiences from all other processing. According to Dennett, consciousness is to be found in the actions and flows of information from place to place, rather than some singular view containing our experience. There is no central experiencer who confers a durable stamp of approval on any particular draft.

Different parts of the neural processing assert more or less control at different times. For something to reach consciousness is akin to becoming famous, in that it must leave behind consequences by which it is remembered. To put it another way, consciousness is the property of having enough influence to affect what the mouth will say and the hands will do. Which inputs are "edited" into our drafts is not an exogenous act of supervision, but part of the self-organizing functioning of the network, and at the same level as the circuitry that conveys information bottom-up.

The conscious self is taken to exist as an abstraction visible at the level of the intentional stance, akin to a body of mass having a "centre of gravity". Analogously, Dennett refers to the self as the "centre of narrative gravity", a story we tell ourselves about our experiences. Consciousness exists, but not independently of behaviour and behavioural disposition, which can be studied through heterophenomenology.

The origin of this operationalist approach can be found in Dennett's immediately preceding work. Dennett (1988) explains consciousness in terms of access consciousness alone, denying the independent existence of what Ned Block has labeled phenomenal consciousness. He argues that "Everything real has properties, and since I don't deny the reality of conscious experience, I grant that conscious experience has properties". Having related all consciousness to properties, he concludes that they cannot be meaningfully distinguished from our judgements about them. He writes: 

In other words, once we've explained a perception fully in terms of how it affects us, there is nothing left to explain. In particular, there is no such thing as a perception which may be considered in and of itself (a quale). Instead, the subject's honest reports of how things seem to them are inherently authoritative on how things seem to them, but not on the matter of how things actually are.

The key to the multiple drafts model is that, after removing qualia, explaining consciousness boils down to explaining the behaviour we recognise as conscious. Consciousness is as consciousness does.

Critical responses
Bogen (1992) points out that the brain is bilaterally symmetrical. That being the case, if Cartesian materialism is true, there might be two Cartesian theatres, so arguments against only one are flawed. Velmans (1992) argues that the phi effect and the cutaneous rabbit illusion demonstrate that there is a delay whilst modelling occurs and that this delay was discovered by Libet.

It has also been claimed that the argument in the multiple drafts model does not support its conclusion.

"Straw man"
Much of the criticism asserts that Dennett's theory attacks the wrong target, failing to explain what it claims to. Chalmers (1996) maintains that Dennett has produced no more than a theory of how subjects report events. Some even parody the title of the book as "Consciousness Explained Away", accusing him of greedy reductionism. Another line of criticism disputes the accuracy of Dennett's characterisations of existing theories:

Unoriginality
Multiple drafts is also attacked for making a claim to novelty. It may be the case, however, that such attacks mistake which features Dennett is claiming as novel. Korb states that, "I believe that the central thesis will be relatively uncontentious for most cognitive scientists, but that its use as a cleaning solvent for messy puzzles will be viewed less happily in most quarters." (Korb 1993) In this way, Dennett uses uncontroversial ideas towards more controversial ends, leaving him open to claims of unoriginality when uncontroversial parts are focused upon.

Even the notion of consciousness as drafts is not unique to Dennett. According to Hankins, Dieter Teichert suggests that Paul Ricoeur's theories agree with Dennett's on the notion that "the self is basically a narrative entity, and that any attempt to give it a free-floating independent status is misguided." [Hankins] Others see Derrida's (1982) representationalism as consistent with the notion of a mind that has perceptually changing content without a definitive present instant.

To those who believe that consciousness entails something more than behaving in all ways conscious, Dennett's view is seen as eliminativist, since it denies the existence of qualia and the possibility of philosophical zombies. However, Dennett is not denying the existence of the mind or of consciousness, only what he considers a naive view of them. The point of contention is whether Dennett's own definitions are indeed more accurate: whether what we think of when we speak of perceptions and consciousness can be understood in terms of nothing more than their effect on behaviour.

Information processing and consciousness
The role of information processing in consciousness has been criticised by John Searle who, in his Chinese room argument, states that he cannot find anything that could be recognised as conscious experience in a system that relies solely on motions of things from place to place. Dennett sees this argument as misleading, arguing that consciousness is not to be found in a specific part of the system, but in the actions of the whole. In essence, he denies that consciousness requires something in addition to capacity for behaviour, saying that philosophers such as Searle, "just can't imagine how understanding could be a property that emerges from lots of distributed quasi-understanding in a large system" (p. 439).

See also

 Artificial consciousness
 Cognitive model
 Conceptual space
 Global Workspace Theory
 Image schema

References

Bibliography
 Consciousness in Modern Science, Oxford University Press 1988. Reprinted in W. Lycan, ed., Mind and Cognition: A Reader, MIT Press, 1990, A. Goldman, ed. Readings in Philosophy and Cognitive Science, MIT Press, 1993

Further reading
 
 
 
 
 Dennett, D. and Kinsbourne, M. (1995) Multiple Drafts (Response to Glicksohn and Salter in Behavioral and Brain Sciences, vol. 18, no. 4, 1995, pp. 810–11.) (Response to Glicksohn and Salter in Behavioral and Brain Sciences, vol. 18, no. 4, 1995, pp. 810–11.)
 Ryle, Gilbert. The Concept of Mind, The University of Chicago Press, 1949.
 Tye, M. (1993). Reflections on Dennett and consciousness. Philosophy and Phenomenological Research 53, 893–898.
 Williams L.M., Liddell B.J., Rathjen J., Brown K.J., Shevrin H., Gray J.A., Phillips M., Young A. & Gordon E. (2004). Mapping the time course of nonconscious and conscious perception of fear: An integration of central and peripheral measures. Human Brain Mapping,21, 64–74

External links

 "Multiple drafts model", a Scholarpedia article by Daniel Dennett and Kathleen Akins.
 The Philosophers Magazine: Philosopher of the Month, April 2003: Daniel Dennett
 'Self and Consciousness: Multiple Perspectives' 1992, The Self as a Center of Narrative Gravity: Daniel Dennett
 'Daniel Dennett – the intentional stance: Peter Hankins'
 'Stage Effects in the Cartesian Theater: A review of Daniel Dennett's Consciousness Explained'
 Multiple Drafts, 1 December 2004, Peter Hankins

Consciousness studies
Cognitive modeling
Cognitive psychology
Theory of mind
Physicalism